The Standing Bureau of the Senate consists of the President of the Senate, four vice-presidents, four secretaries, and four quaestors. The President of the Standing Bureau also serves as the President of the Senate. The President is elected, by secret ballot, for the duration of the legislative period. All the other members are elected at the beginning of each parliamentary session.

The functions are distributed through the political groups respecting the proportions of the political composition of the Senate.

At the moment both Chambers of Parliament are constituted (the seats are validated, the Standing Bureau is elected, the political groups elect their Bureaus). Until the procedures are completed, the session is conducted by the eldest Senator (as President), aided by the two youngest Senators (as Secretaries).

Members

References 

Parliament of Romania
Presiding bodies of legislatures